Vaše is a settlement on the right bank of the Sora River just before its confluence with the Sava River at  Medvode in the Upper Carniola region of Slovenia.

Name
Vaše was first attested in written sources in 1318 as Weisach (later as Watschach in 1353, Waschach in 1373, Waczach in 1393, Wartschach and Watschach in 1444, and Wartschach in 1453). These are all locative forms. The medieval transcriptions indicate that -š- developed from -šč- and that the name is therefore likely derived from the demonym *Vaščane (literally, 'villagers').

References

External links

 Vaše on Geopedia

Populated places in the Municipality of Medvode